Secamone alpini (also known as monkey rope or melktou) is a species of forest creeper in the family Apocynaceae. 
Its natural habitat is the afro-montane forests of eastern and southern Africa, from Kenya to Cape Province.

References

Flora of Africa
alpini
Plants described in 1820